Book of Shadows: Blair Witch 2 is a 2000 soundtrack album for the feature film of the same name, released by Posthuman and Priority Records.

Release
The soundtrack was released on compact disc on October 17, 2000 by Marilyn Manson's label Posthuman Records and Priority Records.

Track listing

References

2000 soundtrack albums
Horror film soundtracks
Priority Records soundtracks